Samuel Mark Dickinson (born 28 January 1985) is an English rugby union player who left  Premiership side Northampton Saints at the end of the 2016/17 season. He began his career at hometown club Caldy before moving to Rotherham Titans in 2009. He plays in the back row but has also spent time at lock. At international level he has represented the England Saxons.

Club career 
Dickinson was born in Manchester and began his career at Caldy. He joined Rotherham Titans in 2009 and played 63 times before moving to Northampton Saints three years later. He broke his arm days after agreeing to move to Saints and eventually made his debut against Exeter Chiefs in September 2013, over 18 months after signing. In April the following year he scored his first points for the Saints with a try in their 28–14 European Challenge Cup quarter-final victory over Sale Sharks. In 2014 Dickson started as Northampton beat Saracens to win the Premiership final.

After making 89 appearances for Saints and captaining Northampton's second side the Wanderers to the Aviva 'A' League title in the 2016/17 season, it was announced that Dickinson would part company with Saints at the conclusion of the current season.

On 13 February 2018, Dickinson signs for RFU Championship club Ealing Trailfinders on long-term deal with immediate effect, leaving Northampton.

International career 
In October 2013 Dickinson was called up to the England Saxons squad as a replacement for Tom Johnson who had been called into the senior squad. The following January he was named in the Saxons Elite Player Squad and he made his debut that month as a replacement against the Ireland Wolfhounds. He made his first start a week later against Scotland A in a 16–16 draw.

References

External links 
Sam Dickinson profile at Northampton Saints
Sam Dickinson profile at the RFU

1985 births
Living people
English rugby union players
Moseley Rugby Football Club players
Northampton Saints players
Rotherham Titans players
Rugby union flankers
Rugby union players from Manchester
Rugby union number eights